The Yuki (also known as Yukiah) are an indigenous people of California who were traditionally divided into three groups: Ukomno'om ("Valley People", or Yuki proper), Huchnom ("Outside the Valley"), and Ukohtontilka or Ukosontilka ("Ocean People", or Coast Yuki). The territory of these three groups included Round Valley and much of northern Mendocino County and Lake County. Today they are enrolled members of the Round Valley Indian Tribes of the Round Valley Reservation. The exonym "Yuki" may derive from the Wintu word meaning "foreigner" or "enemy."

Yuki tribes are thought to have settled as far south as Hood Mountain in present-day Sonoma County.

History
In 1856, the US government established the Indian reservation of Nome Cult Farm (later to become Round Valley Indian Reservation) at Round Valley. It forced thousands of Yuki and other local tribes on to these lands, often without sufficient support for the transition. These events and tensions led to the Mendocino War (1859), where militas of white settlers killed hundreds of Yuki and took others by force to Nome Cult Farm.

Language

The Yuki language is not spoken as much but they are still teaching them in certain schools. It is distantly related to the Wappo language, forming the Yukian family with it. The Yuki people had a quaternary (4-based) counting system, based on counting the spaces between the fingers, rather than the fingers themselves.

Population

Scholarly estimates have varied substantially for the pre-contact populations of most native groups in California, as historians and anthropologists have tried to evaluate early documentation. Alfred L. Kroeber estimated the 1770 population of the Yuki proper, Huchnom, and Coast Yuki as 2,000, 500, and 500, respectively, or 3,000 in all. Sherburne F. Cook initially raised this total slightly to 3,500. Subsequently, he proposed a higher estimate of 9,730 Yuki.

Benjamin Madley wrote that "the Yuki suffered a cataclysmic population decline under United States rule. Between 1854 and 1864, settlement policies, murders, abductions, massacres, rape-induced venereal diseases, and willful neglect at Round Valley Reservation reduced them from perhaps 20,000 to several hundred." In his work, Madley argues that Yuki history constitutes a clear-cut example of genocide. He cites the fact that other than venereal diseases introduced by Europeans, stating that there is no evidence of any epidemic that would have caused such drastic population decline among the Yuki between 1854 and 1864. His research thus challenges the idea that the indirect effects of European colonization were the leading cause of population decline and mass death for Native Americans.

Intermarriage among neighboring tribes after their forced relocation to the Round Valley Reservation resulted in large numbers of Native Americans with mixed ancestry. Many of these people are descendants of many local tribes and have come to be called Round Valley Indian Tribes.

In the 2010 census, 569 people claimed Yuki ancestry. Two hundred fifty-five of them were full-blooded.

Ethnobotany
They use the large roots of Carex to make baskets.

See also
Yuki traditional narratives

References

Sources
 Cook, Sherburne F. 1956. "The Aboriginal Population of the North Coast of California", Anthropological Records, 16:81-130. University of California, Berkeley.
 Cook, Sherburne F. 1976. The Conflict between the California Indian and White Civilization. University of California Press, Berkeley.
 Harrison, K. David 2007. When Languages Die. New York: Oxford University Press.
 Kroeber, A. L. 1925. Handbook of the Indians of California. Bureau of American Ethnology Bulletin No. 78. Washington, D.C.

External links

Round Valley history
, Four Directions Institute

 
Native American tribes in California
Native American tribes in Mendocino County, California